Tuda may refer to 
Tuda of Lindisfarne, 7th-century bishop of Lindisfarne, England
Tuda Murphy (born 1980), Caymanian footballer
Olmeta-di-Tuda, a commune in the Haute-Corse department of France